The 1947 World Fencing Championships were held in Lisbon, Portugal.

Medal table

Medal summary

Men's events

Women's events

References

1947 in fencing
1947 in Portuguese sport
F
Sports competitions in Lisbon
World Fencing Championships
1940s in Lisbon